Anwar Hossain may refer to:
 Anwar Hussain (cricketer) (1920–2002), Pakistani cricketer
 Anwar Hussain (actor) (1925–1988), Indian actor
 Anwar Hossain (actor) (1931–2013), Bangladeshi actor
 Qazi Anwar Hussain (born 1936), Bangladeshi writer
 Anwar Hussein (photographer) (born 1938), Tanzanian photojournalist
 Kazi Anowar Hossain (1941–2007), Bangladeshi painter
 Anwar Hossain Manju (born 1944), Bangladeshi politician
 Anwar Hussain (politician) (born 1947), Indian politician
 Anwar Hossain (photographer) (1948–2018), Bangladeshi photographer, cinematographer, and architect
 M. Anwar Hossain (born 1949), Bangladeshi academic
 Anwar Hossain (physician) (born 1955), Bangladesh Awami League politician
 Anwar Hossain Khan (bon 1961),  Bangladeshi politician from Lakshmipur
 Anwar Hossain Monir (born 1981), Bangladeshi cricketer
 Anwar Hossain (cricketer) (born 1983), Bangladeshi cricketer
 Anwar Hussain Laskar, Indian politician
 Anwar Hossein Panahi, Iranian political activist
 Anwar Hussain (officer), a general of Bangladesh Army
 Anwar Hossain Howlader, Bangladeshi politician from Patuakhali

See also